"Dear Jane" is a song written by Benji Madden and Joel Madden for The Madden Brothers' first studio album Greetings from California. It was released as a single on September 3, 2014.

Lyric video
A lyric video for "Dear Jane" appeared on Vevo on September 3, 2014. It was sponsored by the Honda Civic Tour for the Honda Stage.

Charts

References

2014 songs
2014 singles
The Madden Brothers songs
Songs written by Benji Madden
Songs written by Joel Madden
Capitol Records singles